It Might as Well Be Spring is a solo album by American jazz pianist Kenny Drew recorded in 1981 and released on the Soul Note label.

Reception
The Allmusic review awarded the album 4½ stars stating "Kenny Drew's 1981 solo piano session for Soul Note is a notch better than his 1973 Steeplechase CD, Everything I Love. In the space of less than a decade, the veteran shows tremendous growth".

Track listing
All compositions by Kenny Drew except as indicated
 "Yesterdays" (Otto Harbach, Jerome Kern) - 6:43    
 "Blues for Nils" - 4:25    
 "The Quiet Cathedral" - 5:13    
 "Sunset" - 4:35    
 "It Might as Well Be Spring" (Oscar Hammerstein II, Richard Rodgers) - 7:01    
 "The Smile of Tanya" (Sahib Shihab) - 5:12    
 "Django" (John Lewis) - 6:04    
 "Dreams" - 3:40

Personnel
Kenny Drew - piano

References

1982 albums
Black Saint/Soul Note albums
Kenny Drew albums
Solo piano jazz albums